Soum de Ramond, also known as Pico de Añisclo  in Spanish and Aragonese, is a mountain of 3,263 metres in the Monte Perdido massif in the Aragonese Pyrenees in northern Spain. It is one of the three mountains comprising Las Tres Sorores, the others being Monte Perdido (3,355 m) and Cilindro de Marboré (3,328 m).

The mountain lies between the Ordesa Valley, the Añisclo Canyon and the Pineta Valley, inside the Ordesa y Monte Perdido National Park. The Aragonese name "Pico Anyisclo" originates from the eponymous valley in the Aragonese Pyrenees. Later on, the mountain was named "Soum de Ramond" after Louis Ramond de Carbonnières, the French politician, geologist and botanist.

See also
List of Pyrenean three-thousanders

External links
 
 "Soum de Ramond / Pico de Añisclo ( 3.254 m )", at mendikat.net, retrieved 2013-08-20 (in Spanish)
 "Añisclo, a Canyon of the Pyrenees", at altoaragon.org, retrieved 2013-08-20 (in English)

References 

Mountains of Aragon
Mountains of the Pyrenees
Pyrenean three-thousanders